Aïn Nouïssy is a district in Mostaganem Province, Algeria. It was named after its capital, Aïn Nouïssy.

Municipalities
The district is further divided into 3 municipalities:
Aïn Nouïssy
Fornaka
El Hassaine-Béni Yahi

Districts of Mostaganem Province